The impact depth of a projectile is the distance it penetrates into a target before coming to a stop. The physicist Sir Isaac Newton first developed this idea to get rough approximations for the impact depth for projectiles traveling at high velocities.

Newton's approximation for the impact depth

Newton's approximation for the impact depth for projectiles at high velocities is based only on momentum considerations. Nothing is said about where the impactor's kinetic energy goes, nor what happens to the momentum after the projectile is stopped.

The basic idea is simple: The impactor carries a given momentum. To stop the impactor, this momentum must be transferred onto another mass. Since the impactor's velocity is so high that cohesion within the target material can be neglected, the momentum can only be transferred to the material (mass) directly in front of the impactor, which will be pushed at the impactor's speed. If the impactor has pushed a mass equal to its own mass at this speed, its whole momentum has been transferred to the mass in front of it and the impactor will be stopped. For a cylindrical impactor, by the time it stops, it will have penetrated to a depth that is equal to its own length times its relative density with respect to the target material.

This approach is only valid for a narrow range of velocities less than the speed of sound within the target or impactor material.

If the impact velocity is greater than the speed of sound within the target or impactor material, impact shock causes the material to fracture, and at higher velocities to behave like a gas, causing rapid ejection of target and impactor material and the formation of a crater. The depth of the crater depends on the material properties of impactor and target, as well as the velocity of impact. Typically, greater impact velocity means greater crater depth.

Applications

Projectile: Full metal projectiles should be made of a material with a very high density, like uranium (19.1 g/cm3) or lead (11.3 g/cm3). According to Newton's approximation, a full metal projectile made of uranium will pierce through roughly 2.5 times its own length of steel armor.
Shaped charge, bazooka: For a shaped charge (anti-tank) to pierce through steel plates, it is essential that the explosion generates a long heavy metal jet (in a shaped charge for anti-tank use, the explosion generates a high speed metal jet from the cone shaped metal lining).  This jet may then be viewed as the impactor of Newton's approximation.
Meteorite: As may be concluded from the air pressure, the atmosphere's material is equivalent to about 10 m of water. Since ice has about the same density as water, an ice cube from space travelling at 15 km/s or so must have a length of 10 m to reach the surface of the earth at high speed. A smaller ice cube will be slowed to terminal velocity. A larger ice cube may also be slowed, however, as long as it comes in at a very low angle and thus has to pierce through a lot of atmosphere. An iron meteorite with a length of 1.3 m would punch through the atmosphere; a smaller one would be slowed by the air and fall at terminal velocity to the ground. 
Impactor, bunker buster: Solid impactors can be used instead of nuclear warheads to penetrate bunkers deep underground. According to Newton's approximation, a uranium projectile (density 19 g/cm3) at high speed and 1 m in length would punch its way through 6 m of rock (density 3 g/cm3) before coming to a stop.

See also
Impact force

Further reading

External links
Earth Impact Effects Program
Space debris penetration depth by velocity and diameter

Projectiles
Isaac Newton